The Cornplanter Tract or Cornplanter Indian Reservation is a plot of land in Warren County, Pennsylvania that was administered by the Seneca tribe. The tract consisted of  along the Allegheny River.

The tract comprised the only native reserved lands within the state of Pennsylvania during its existence. It was originally established in 1796 as a grant to Seneca diplomat Cornplanter, also known as John Abeel III, for his personal use, with the right to pass the plot down through his descendants forever. Cornplanter promptly opened up his plot to native settlement, and within two years, 400 Seneca were living on the tract. In 1918, most of Cornplanter's descendants were killed in the 1918 flu pandemic, and Jesse Cornplanter, the last male heir, died in 1957 without having children, leaving the plot without ownership. The plot was already largely abandoned as a residence by the time of Jesse's death, and a 1941 map (seen at right) shows only scattered buildings on the tract.

In the early 1960s, construction of the Kinzua Dam created the Allegheny Reservoir, which submerged the vast majority of the tract. Graves located in a cemetery on the tract mostly were exhumed and their bodies were reinterred in higher ground.

References

1796 establishments in Pennsylvania
1964 disestablishments in Pennsylvania
Unincorporated communities in Warren County, Pennsylvania
Iroquois populated places
Former American Indian reservations
Native_American_history_of_Pennsylvania